Carl Tchilinghiryan (27 February 1910 – 8 May 1987) was a German businessman of Armenian origin, who co-founded the coffee house Tchibo.

Career
In 1949, together with Max Herz, he founded the "Frisch-Röst-Kaffee Carl Tchiling GmbH", which today is known as Tchibo.

Before founding the Tchibo company Tchilinghiryan dealt as a dried fruit specialist in dates, figs and trail mix.

In order to facilitate the pronunciation of his Armenian name for future Tchibo customers, Tchilinghiryan changed the spelling of his name to "Carl Tchiling-Hiryan".

Death
Tchilinghiryan is buried at the Ohlsdorf Cemetery in Hamburg, Germany, in a family tomb together with his parents Karabet Tchilinghiryan (21 July 1869 – 12 November 1927) and Erna Tchilinghiryan, née Petersen (18 May 1887 – 12 July 1959).

Tchibo is 100% owned by the Herz family, Ingeburg Herz (Max Herz's widow), and two of her sons, Michael Herz and Wolfgang Herz, through their company Maxingvest AG.

Further reading
 Der Hamburger Hauptfriedhof Ohlsdorf. Geschichte und Grabmäler - Band 1 und Band 2. Hans Christians Verlag. Hamburg, 1990
 Hamburgische Biografie - Personenlexikon, Bd. 5

References 

 HANDEL / KAFFEE - Heiß wie die Hölle. Der Spiegel. 17.10.1962
 Der Parkfriedhof Ohlsdorf in Hamburg, Teil II. Münchener Begräbnisverein e.V.

1910 births
1987 deaths
Businesspeople in coffee
German people of Armenian descent
German company founders
20th-century German businesspeople
Burials at the Ohlsdorf Cemetery